ABCB may refer to:

 Alcoholic Beverage Control Board (District of Columbia), an independent adjudicatory body of the District of Columbia
 Australian Broadcasting Control Board, an Australian government agency
 Australian Building Codes Board, an Australian government agency
 Cafe ABCB, a locale in the manga/anime Kimagure Orange Road.